CJRM-FM was a French-language Canadian radio station located in Montreal, Quebec.  It opened on September 30, 1965 and closed on June 24, 1968 due to financial difficulties.

The station broadcast on 98.5 MHz with an effective radiated power of 100,000 watts using an omnidirectional antenna (class C1). It had a classical music format.

Licensed as one of the first standalone FM stations in Canada, the station's budget was so tight that it had only four employees (which was unusual at the time for a radio station), and it relied entirely on newspapers as a source for news bulletins. The station was plagued with serious technical and financial difficulties; listeners received the station with indifference.

One consequence of the failure of CJRM-FM to succeed with its classical music format was that the Canadian Radio-television and Telecommunications Commission (CRTC) rejected for decades new applications to open a private classical music station in Montreal. When the CRTC finally gave Jean-Pierre Coallier permission to open CJPX-FM in 1997, that station would turn out to be a success.

The 98.5 MHz frequency was reactivated in the Montreal area on April 9, 1977, when CIEL-FM (now CHMP-FM) went on the air.

References

External links

Jrm
Jrm
Jrm
Radio stations disestablished in 1968
1968 disestablishments in Quebec
1965 establishments in Quebec 
Radio_stations_established_in_1965
JRM